In enzymology, an adenylylsulfate-ammonia adenylyltransferase is an enzyme that catalyzes the chemical reaction adenylyl sulfate + NH3  adenosine 5'-phosphoramidate + sulfate.

Thus, the two substrates of this enzyme are adenylyl sulfate and NH3, whereas its two products are adenosine 5'-phosphoramidate and sulfate.

This enzyme belongs to the family of transferases, specifically those transferring phosphorus-containing nucleotide groups (nucleotidyltransferases).  The systematic name of this enzyme class is adenylyl-sulfate:ammonia adenylyltransferase. Other names in common use include APSAT, and adenylylsulfate:ammonia adenylyltransferase.

References

 
 

EC 2.7.7
Enzymes of unknown structure